Ruangrupa, stylised as ruangrupa and abbreviated as ruru, is a contemporary art collective based in Jakarta, Indonesia. Founded in 2000 by a group of seven artists, ruangrupa provided a platform in South Jakarta for organising exhibitions, events, and festivals, also conducting publishing services, workshops, and research.

ruangrupa functions as a non-profit organisation that supports contemporary art within the urban and cultural contexts of Indonesia and beyond, often involving artists and practitioners from other disciplines such as the social sciences, politics, and technology. The collective also supports the development of video art through research, documentation, and their biennial video art festival, OK Video, first held in July 2003.

As a collective, they are co-directing documenta fifteen, taking place 2022 in Kassel, Germany; notably the first Asian group and the first art collective to curate the large-scale international exhibition. While the collective has no fixed number of members, ten of the group's core members will engage in the directorship role, including director Ade Darmawan, Ajeng Nurul Aini, Daniella Fitria Praptono, Farid Rakun, Indra Ameng, Iswanto Hartono, Julia Sarisetiati, Mirwan Andan, Narpati Awangga, and Reza Afisina.

History

Origins 
Loosely translated from Bahasa Indonesia to mean "a space for art" or "a space form", ruangrupa was founded in 2000 by artists seeking to create much-needed space where artists could work intensively with an emphasis on critical analysis, rather than production. Established two years after the fall of the authoritarian Suharto regime, the collective notably emerged at a moment of newfound freedom for Indonesia. ruangrupa is also a part of the Ford Foundation and Arts Collaboratory organisation network, receiving financial support from these networks.

Since its founding, ruangrupa has changed its format and organisational structure twice. In 2015, ruangrupa developed the cultural platform Gudang Sarinah Ekosistem (GSE) together with a number of art collectives in Jakarta, an interdisciplinary space seeking to support creatives, communities, and institutions. The platform takes its name from Gudang Sarinah, their new headquarters located in Pancoran, South Jakarta. In 2018, together with two other Jakarta-based art collectives, Serrum and Grafis Huru Hara, ruangrupa initiated GUDSKUL: Contemporary Art Collective and Ecosystem Studies, a public learning space.

documenta fifteen 

In 2019, it was announced that ruangrupa would serve as artistic director for Documenta fifteen collectively, the first time an Asian group or an art collective would curate the large-scale, international exhibition. The curatorial concept ruangrupa prepared for documenta fifteen centres upon the notion of lumbung, a rice barn that stores the communally-produced common resource of rice for future use. Documenta fifteen is thus conceived as a collective resource pot, operating under the logics of the commons to mend today's injuries that are allegedly rooted in colonialism, capitalism, and patriarchy; echoing the original intent of Documenta, an event launched to heal European war wounds. The curatorial approach is based on an international network of localised, community-based art organisations. A mural at the exhibition by the group Taring Padi came under intense controversy over what the German and Israeli governments condemned as antisemitic imagery, and the mural was subsequently covered up and taken down. Due to the complications about the artwork, Sabine Schormann announced her resignation as general director at documenta fifteen, which met almost unanimous positive response in Germany.

Publications 
 The Collective Eye/ Emma Nilsson, Dominique Lucien Garaudel, Heinz-Norbert Jocks (Edit): The Collective Eye in conversation with ruangrupa—Thoughts on Collective Practice, ISBN  978-3-95476-466-2

Major exhibitions and projects

References

External links 

 Official website
 DECOMPRESSION#10 – Expanding The Space and Public (link archived here)
 The Sweet and Sour Story of Sugar (link archived here)

Asian artist groups and collectives
Indonesian artists
2000 establishments in Indonesia
Organizations based in Jakarta